Græsted South halt (previously: Pibemose Trinbræt) is a railway halt serving the southern part of the town of Græsted in North Zealand, Denmark.

Græsted South is located on the Gribskov Line from Hillerød to Gilleleje. The train services are operated by the railway company Lokaltog which runs frequent local train services between Hillerød station and Gilleleje station.

See also
 List of railway stations in Denmark

References

External links

 Lokaltog
 Gribskovbanen on jernbanen.dk

Railway stations in the Capital Region of Denmark
Buildings and structures in Gribskov Municipality